Thierry Huillet (born 21 July 1965) is a French pianist and composer of classical and contemporary classical music.

As pianist 
Born in Toulouse, Huillet won first prize at the Conservatoire de Paris where he was a pupil of Pierre Sancan and Germaine Mounier.

In 1987, Huillet won first prize at the Cleveland International Piano Competition. He is also laureate of the Ferruccio Busoni International Piano Competition (Bolzano, Italy, 1986, 1994) et du International Music Competition of Japan (Tokyo, 1989).
Il a été invité à jouer dans des salles prestigieuses et avec de nombreux grands orchestres.

 
He forms a duo with violinist and violist Clara Cernat, his wife.

As composer 
Huillet started composing very late. Nevertheless, his work, very lyrical, already contains more than a hundred opus among which concertos (for violin, violin and viola, piano or oboe), chamber music including a concert for piano and violin Le petit prince. He has also produced numerous transcriptions.

His works are created by great artists but also by the "duo Cernat-Huillet" or the "trio Huillet" where the couple is joined by clarinetist Gari Cayuelas-Krasznai.

Discography 
 Georges Enesco's Sonatas for violin and piano, Ed. La Nuit Transfigurée
 Ernest Bloch's Works for violin and piano - Ed. La Nuit Transfigurée
 Joaquin Turina's Sanluqueña, works for violin and piano - Ed. La Nuit Transfigurée 
 Aymé Kunc, édition du cinquantenaire - Ed. Suoni e colori
 Ernest Chausson (Concert, Poème...) with the Romanian Radio Chamber Orchestra, dir. Ludovic Bacs - Ed. CCTH - Radio Roumaine
 "Récital live" (Beethoven, Bloch, Brahms, Enesco, Fauré) - Ed. CCTH
 Thierry Huillet, Works for violin and piano & for piano alone Ed. La Nuit Transfigurée
 Sergei Rachmaninov's works for 2 pianos Thierry Huillet and Maurizio Baglini - Ed. La Nuit Transfigurée
 Poèmes lyriques & Musiques ingénues, works by Jean Clergue and Marcel Dardigna - Ed. La Nuit Transfigurée
 Maurice Ravel's chamber music, Thierry Huillet, Stéphane Tran Ngoc and Xavier Gagnepain, Ed. REM
 Piano Romantique Thierry Huillet (Liszt, Granados, Guyard) - Ed. Apogée  
 Les Révélations of the  1998 at the MIDEM of Cannes" (Enesco) - Ed. ADAMI
 "Anthem of Europe" Thierry Huillet - Council of Europe publisher– Waterpipe Records
 Rêveur, tzigane et diabolique (Saint-Saëns, Ravel, Liszt, Huillet, Porumbescu, Sarasate) - Ed. Mezzanotte

References

External links 
 Thierry Huillet's discography (Discogs)
 Thierry Huillet's biography (MusicMe)
 Thierry Huillet's Official website
 Clara Cernat and Thierry Huillet's Official website
 Thierry Huillet
 Bach Prelude and Fugue E flat minor BWV 853 by Thierry Huillet live (YouTube)

1965 births
Musicians from Toulouse
Living people
20th-century French male classical pianists
21st-century French male classical pianists
21st-century French composers
Conservatoire de Paris alumni
Cleveland International Piano Competition prize-winners